Gun Shy is a British action comedy film directed by Simon West starring Antonio Banderas. It was released on 8 September 2017.

Synopsis 
Aging rock star Turk Enry's supermodel wife is kidnapped while they are vacationing in Chile and he undertakes to rescue her equipped with skills better suited to playing bass, playing the field, and partying.

Cast

Production 

The film was produced under the working title Salty (the name of the novel from which it is adapted) but the title was later changed to Gun Shy. The budget was obtained through equity crowdfunding, with the film raising £1.9 million on SyndicateRoom.

Reception 
On review aggregator Rotten Tomatoes, Gun Shy has an approval rating of 0% based on 11 reviews and an average rating of 2.9/10. On Metacritic, the film has a weighted average score of 21 out of 100 based on five critics, indicating "generally unfavorable reviews".

References

External links 
 
 
 Gun Shy at The Numbers

2017 films
2017 action comedy films
British action comedy films
Crowdfunded films
Films about music and musicians
Films about kidnapping
Films based on American novels
Films directed by Simon West
Films set in Chile
2017 comedy films
2010s British films